Orlando Anibal Carrió Vicidomini (5 August 1955 – 26 May 2002) was an Argentine-Mexican actor. He died from lung cancer on 26 May 2002.

Filmography

 Aprender a vivir (1982)
 Entre el amor y el poder (1984)
 Yolanda Luján (1984)
 El Pulpo negro (1985)
 De carne somos (1988)
 Rebelde (1989)
 Mi pequeña Soledad (1990)
 Madres egoistas (1991)
 Las secretas intenciones (1992)
 Dulce Ana (1995)
 Los Ángeles no lloran (1996)
 Los Herederos del poder (1997)
 Ricos y Famosos (1997)
 Señoras sin señores (1998)
 Mi destino eres tú (2000)
 Sin pecado concebido (2001)

External links
 

1955 births
2002 deaths
People from La Plata
Argentine male film actors
Argentine male television actors
Argentine male telenovela actors
20th-century Argentine male actors
21st-century Argentine male actors
Argentine emigrants to Mexico
Mexican people of Argentine descent
Naturalized citizens of Mexico
Mexican male film actors
Mexican male television actors
Mexican male telenovela actors
20th-century Mexican male actors
21st-century Mexican male actors
Deaths from lung cancer in Mexico